WHOJ (91.9 FM) is a radio station  broadcasting a Christian radio format. Licensed to Terre Haute, Indiana, United States, the station serves the Terre Haute area.  The station is currently owned by Covenant Network.

History
The station began broadcasting in 1997, and held the call sign WAPC. It was owned by American Family Association and was an affiliate of American Family Radio. In January 2004, the station was sold to IHR Educational Broadcasting. In March 2004, it was sold to Covenant Network, along with KBKC, for $112,500. On June 3, 2004, the station changed its call sign to the current WHOJ.

Translators
In addition to the main station, WHOJ is relayed by an additional translator to widen its broadcast area.

References

External links

HOJ
Radio stations established in 1997
1997 establishments in Indiana
HOJ